The Arboretum de l'Hort de Dieu is an arboretum on the southern flank of Mont Aigoual, about  north of Le Vigan, Gard, Languedoc-Roussillon, France, at the border of Gard and Lozère. It is open daily without charge.

The arboretum was created in 1902 by Charles Henri Marie Flahault (1852–1935) and Georges Fabre to help reduce the effects of excessive grazing and timber production. It was planted with spruce, larch, black pine, etc. and is accessible via a hiking path from the Observatoire de l'Aigoual.

See also 
 List of botanical gardens in France

External links 
 French Wikipedia entry :fr:Arboretum de l'Hort de Dieu
 Conservatoire des Jardins et Paysages entry (French)
 IDGO article (French)
 Causses Aigoual Cevennes entry (French)

Hort de Dieu, Arboretum de
Hort de Dieu, Arboretum de